Wally is the name of the official mascot of the Australian rugby union team, the Wallabies.

Wally is a wallaby.

The stuffed toy version of the mascot is carried with the Wallabies on overseas tours to Europe. It then becomes the duty of the youngest member of the touring party to protect the mascot from pranks by older players to hide and sabotage it. It is considered an embarrassment to the protector if Wally is not safely guarded.   The protector is forced to hold Wally at all times.  It becomes a source of entertainment for senior players when the team is out socialising.

Events
When Berrick Barnes was forced to protect Wally during the 2007 World Cup in France he had to stitch it up several times and perform a search of every member's hotel room to retrieve it, despite the help of Lote Tuqiri.

During the 2008 tour it became a long-running joke among the players that the mascot could be used by 18-year-old James O'Connor to break the ice with young ladies.

In May 2007 a Welsh rugby fan was ejected from a stadium in Sydney during a match for attempting to dance with the life-size version of Wally.

See also

List of Australian sporting mascots

References

External links

Sports mascots
Animal mascots
Australian mascots
Australia national rugby union team
Rugby football culture
Sports culture in Australia